The Mazda MX-30 is a subcompact crossover SUV produced by Mazda and sold as a battery electric (BEV), plug-in hybrid (PHEV) or mild hybrid (MHEV) variant. Based on the CX-30, it was unveiled at the 2019 Tokyo Motor Show. Production of the vehicle, which is Mazda's first mass-produced electric car, began at their Ujina factory on 19 May 2020.

Overview 

The MX-30 features clamshell doors, referred to as "freestyle doors" by Mazda and previously seen on their rotary-engined RX-8 sports car. It uses MacPherson strut front suspension and torsion beam rear suspension.

Up to 80% charge can be achieved within 30 to 40 minutes via 40 kW DC charging. With a 6.6 kW AC (1 phase, 230V, 29A) charging unit, the MX-30 is claimed to get fully recharged within 4.5 hours. 

The plug-in hybrid variant was presented on 14 January 2023. Its drivetrain operates in series, featuring a rotary engine that acts as a range extender to recharge the batteries, but not to power the vehicle's wheels directly. In Japan, Australia and New Zealand, a gasoline-powered all-wheel-drive mild hybrid version is also available. This version is powered by Mazda's 2.0 L e-Skyactiv-G four-cylinder engine.

The all-electric MX-30 went on sale in Japan and Europe in the fall of 2020. In the United Kingdom, it is slated to go on sale in early 2021. The EV model will go on sale in California in fall 2021, with the plug-in hybrid model coming later.

Safety 
The Mazda MX-30 received a 5-star rating by the Euro NCAP in 2020. It was also the first car to achieve a maximum rating under the new Euro NCAP criteria.

Awards and reviews 
The MX-30 made the 10 Best List of the 2020-2021 Car of the Year Japan Awards. It also won the 2020 Red Dot Design Award in the Electric Vehicle category.

Nonprofit consumer organisation Consumer Reports stated, "With such a small battery, the EPA-estimated range is a scant 100 miles. That would have been competitive a decade ago, but it's not in today's EV market." CR called it a "strange little car" and found the vehicle noisy but applauded fit and finish and said it was "a fun little handler."

Notes

References

External links 

 

MX-30
Electric concept cars
Mini sport utility vehicles
Crossover sport utility vehicles
Front-wheel-drive vehicles
Euro NCAP small family cars
Cars introduced in 2019
2020s cars
Production electric cars
Plug-in hybrid vehicles
Hybrid electric cars